The Qatar women's national handball team is the national team of Qatar. It is governed by the Qatar Handball Association and takes part in international handball competitions.

Asian Championship record
 2008 – 10th

External links

IHF profile

National team
Women's national handball teams
Handball